W. Broughton Johnston (May 21, 1905 – August 1978) was the Democratic President of the West Virginia Senate from Mercer County and served from 1949 to 1953. He was born in McDowell County, West Virginia. His father and mother name was Walter L Johnston and Nellie F Johnston respectively.

References

West Virginia state senators
Presidents of the West Virginia State Senate
1905 births
1978 deaths
20th-century American politicians